The Bad Girl, originally published in 2006 in Spanish as Travesuras de la niña mala (literally - The mischief of the bad girl), is a novel by Peruvian author Mario Vargas Llosa, who won the Nobel Prize in Literature in 2010.

Journalist Kathryn Harrison approvingly argues that the book is a rewrite (rather than simply a recycling) of the French realist Gustave Flaubert's classic novel Madame Bovary (1856). In Vargas Llosa's version, the plot relates the decades-long obsession of its narrator, a Peruvian expatriate, with a woman with whom he first fell in love when they were both teenagers.

Notes

References
.

2006 novels
Novels by Mario Vargas Llosa
Novels set in Lima
Novels set in Paris